Garfield McMahon (born 25 February 1932) is a Canadian former sports shooter. He competed at the 1960 Summer Olympics and the 1964 Summer Olympics.

References

1934 births
Living people
Canadian male sport shooters
Olympic shooters of Canada
Shooters at the 1960 Summer Olympics
Shooters at the 1964 Summer Olympics
Sportspeople from Manitoba
Shooters at the 1966 British Empire and Commonwealth Games
Commonwealth Games medallists in shooting
Commonwealth Games bronze medallists for Canada
Pan American Games medalists in shooting
Pan American Games silver medalists for Canada
Pan American Games bronze medalists for Canada
Shooters at the 1963 Pan American Games
Shooters at the 1959 Pan American Games
Medalists at the 1963 Pan American Games
20th-century Canadian people
Medallists at the 1966 British Empire and Commonwealth Games